Jazz 'n' Samba is an album by American jazz vibraphonist Milt Jackson featuring performances recorded in 1964 for the Impulse! label.

Reception
The Allmusic review by Scott Yanow stated "This is an odd LP. The first session is a conventional one... The flip side substitutes two guitars for Flanagan's piano and uses bossa nova rhythms in hopes of getting a hit".

Track listing
All compositions by Milt Jackson except as indicated
 "Blues for Juanita" - 5:44
 "I Got It Bad (And That Ain't Good)" (Duke Ellington, Paul Francis Webster) - 2:42
 "Big George" - 4:49
 "Gingerbread Boy" (Jimmy Heath) - 3:46
 "Jazz 'n' Samba" (Antonio Carlos Jobim, Vinícius de Moraes, Norman Gimbel) - 2:14
 "The Oo-Oo Bossa Nova" (Manny Albam) - 3:08
 "I Love You" (Cole Porter) - 4:39
 "Kiss and Run" (Rene Dononcin, William Engvick, Jack Ledru, Ella Fitzgerald) - 3:28
 "Jazz Bossa Nova" - 3:01
Recorded at Rudy Van Gelder Studio in Englewood Cliffs, New Jersey on August 6, 1964 (tracks 1-4) and August 7, 1964 (tracks 5-9)

Personnel
Milt Jackson – vibes
Jimmy Heath - tenor saxophone (tracks 1, 3-6, 8 & 9)
Howard Collins, Barry Galbraith – guitar (tracks 5-9)
Tommy Flanagan – piano (tracks 1-4)
Richard Davis – bass
Connie Kay – drums
Joe E. Ross (track 6), Lillian Clark (tracks 5 and 8) - vocals

References 

Impulse! Records albums
Milt Jackson albums
1964 albums
Albums recorded at Van Gelder Studio
Albums produced by Bob Thiele
Samba albums